Peter Thomas Wolczanski is the George W. and Grace L. Todd professor of
Chemistry at Cornell University.

Education
Wolczanski obtained his B.S. in Chemistry at the Massachusetts Institute of Technology in 1976 while doing research under the direction of Mark Wrighton. He entered graduate school at the California Institute of Technology, working under John Bercaw on various chemistries of permethylzirconocene hydrides and was awarded a doctorate degree in 1981.

Awards and Professional Activities
Fellow, American Academy of Arts and Sciences (1999)
Casimir Funk Natural Science Award, Polish Institute of Arts & Sciences of America (1998)
Alfred P. Sloan Foundation Fellow (1987-1989)
J. S. Fluor Fellow (1980)
 2011 ACS Award in Organometallic Chemistry
 Fellow, American Academy of Arts and Sciences (1999) 
 Casimir Funk Natural Science Award, Polish Institute of Arts & Sciences of America (1998 
 Dow Chemical Co., Technical Advisory Boards (1996-2003 (Synthesis), 2006-2007 
 Visiting Miller Research Professorship, Univ. California, Berkeley (1995) 
 Fellow, Alfred P. Sloan Foundation (1987-1989 
 Union Carbide Innovation Recognition Program (1988 
 Chair, Organometallic Subdivision, ACS Division of Inorganic Chemistry (1994-1995) 
 Executive Committee, ACS Division of Inorganic Chemistry (1991-1993)

Selected publications

"Carbon Monoxide Cleavage by (silox)3Ta (silox = tBu3SiO-): Physical, Theoretical and Mechanistic Investigations." Neithamer, D.R.; LaPointe, R.E.; Wheeler, R.A.; Richeson, D.S.; Van Duyne, G.D.; Wolczanski, P.T. J. Am. Chem. Soc. 1989, 111, 9056-9072.
"Symmetry and Geometry Considerations of Atom Transfer:  Deoxygenation of (silox)3WNO and R3PO (R = Me, Ph, tBu) by (silox)3M (M = V, NbL (L = PMe3, 4-picoline), Ta; silox = tBu3SiO)."  Veige, A. S.; Slaughter, L. M.; Lobkovsky, E. B.; Wolczanski, P. T.; Matsunaga, N.; Decker, S. A.; Cundari, T. R. Inorg. Chem. 2003, 42, 6204-6224.
"Thermodynamics, Kinetics and Mechanism of (silox)3M(olefin) to (silox)3M(alkylidene) Rearrangements (silox = tBu3SiO; M = Nb, Ta)."  Hirsekorn, K. F.; Veige, A. S.; Marshak, M. P.; Koldobskaya, Y.; Wolczanski, P. T.; Cundari, T. R.; Lobkovsky, E. B. J. Am. Chem. Soc. 2005, 127, 4809-4830.
"3-Center-4-Electron Bonding in [(silox)2Mo=NR]2(µ-Hg) Controls Reactivity while Frontier Orbitals Permit a Dimolybdenum π-Bond Energy Estimate."  Rosenfeld, D. C.; Wolczanski, P. T.; Barakat, K. A.; Buda, C.; Cundari, T. R. J. Am. Chem. Soc. 2005, 127, 8262-8263.
"PC Bond Cleavage of (silox)3NbPMe3 (silox = tBu3SiO) under Dihydrogen Leads to (silox)3Nb=CH2, (silox)3Nb=PH or (silox)3NbP(H)Nb(silox)3, and CH4." Hirsekorn, K. F.; Veige, A. S.; Wolczanski, P. T.  J. Am. Chem. Soc. 2006, 128, 2192-2193.

References

External links
 Wolczanski Group Website

21st-century American chemists
American people of Polish descent
Massachusetts Institute of Technology School of Science alumni
California Institute of Technology alumni
People from Utica, New York
Cornell University faculty
Living people
1954 births
Fellows of the American Academy of Arts and Sciences
Scientists from New York (state)